The eleventh series of Made in Chelsea, a British structured-reality television programme, was confirmed on 1 March 2016 to begin on 11 April 2016 on E4 and concluded on 27 June 2016 following eleven regular episodes and a "The Aftermath" special hosted by Rick Edwards. This is the first series not to feature original cast member Spencer Matthews following his departure during the previous series, as well as long running cast member Oliver Proudlock. Ahead of the series, it was confirmed that Jessica Dixon and Olivia Bentley had joined the series as new cast members, however Jessica only appeared in four episodes. They were joined by Frankie Gaff and Matt Draper midway through the series. This is the final series to feature long-serving cast member Lucy Watson, as well as, James Dunmore, Nicola Hughes, Millie Wilkinson and Tallulah Rufus-Isaacs. The series focused heavily on the fallout between Lucy and Stephanie and the consequences it had for the remaining cast, as well blossoming romance between Jamie and Frankie despite cheating allegations. It also featured Sam and Tiff's turbulent relationship hit a number of obstacles, and the breakdown of Binky and JP's relationship.

Cast

Episodes

{| class="wikitable plainrowheaders" style="width:100%; background:#fff;"
! style="background:#FAAC58;"| Seriesno.
! style="background:#FAAC58;"| Episodeno.
! style="background:#FAAC58;"| Title
! style="background:#FAAC58;"| Original air date
! style="background:#FAAC58;"| Duration
! style="background:#FAAC58;"| UK viewers

|}

Ratings

External links

References

2016 British television seasons
Made in Chelsea seasons